Luc Kroon (born 30 August 2001) is a Dutch swimmer from Volendam. He is the current holder of the Dutch records in swimming in the 400m freestyle and 800m freestyle short-course. He competed at the 2020 European Aquatics Championships in the 400 metre freestyle event. He won with the team the silver medal in the mixed 4 × 100 metre freestyle relay event.

Personal bests

References

External links
 

2001 births
Living people
Dutch male freestyle swimmers
People from Volendam
European Aquatics Championships medalists in swimming
21st-century Dutch people
Sportspeople from North Holland